Fillmore is a ghost town in Douglas County, Illinois, United States.

References

Geography of Douglas County, Illinois
Ghost towns in Illinois